David J. Brown may refer to:

 David J. Brown (cricketer) (born 1942), English Test cricketer
 David W. J. Brown (1942–2021), English cricketer
 David J. Brown, Sr. (born 1946), Australian footballer
 David J. Brown (computer scientist) (born 1957), American computer scientist
 David Jay Brown (born 1961), American writer, interviewer, and consciousness researcher

See also
 David Brown (disambiguation)